Herrada is a Spanish surname. Notable people with the surname include:

Grecia Herrada (born 1993), Peruvian volleyball player
Jesús Herrada (born 1990), Spanish cyclist
José Herrada (born 1985), Spanish cyclist

Spanish-language surnames
Surnames of Spanish origin